San Jacintito, also known as El Ranchito, is a town in the municipality of San Martín de Hidalgo in the state of Jalisco, Mexico. It has a population of 119 inhabitants.

References

External links 
San Jacintito (El Ranchito) at PueblosAmerica.com

Populated places in Jalisco